The 1938–39 İstanbul Football League season was the 31st season of the league. Beşiktaş JK won the league for the third time.

Season

References

Istanbul Football League seasons
Turkey
2